Freudeita is a genus of leaf beetles in the subfamily Eumolpinae. They are found in South America. The genus is dedicated to the German entomologist .

In May 2019, the New Zealand Environmental Protection Authority approved an application to introduce Freudeita cf. cupripennis as a biological control agent against the moth plant (Araujia hortorum), an invasive weed in New Zealand.

Species

 Freudeita alternata (Lefèvre, 1891)
 Freudeita callosa Bechyné, 1953
 Freudeita chalcites (Lefèvre, 1884)
 Freudeita colligens Bechyné, 1951
 Freudeita cruda Bechyné, 1951
 Freudeita cuprinula Bechyné, 1950
 Freudeita cuprinula cuprinula Bechyné, 1950
 Freudeita cuprinula fortis Bechyné & Bechyné, 1964
 Freudeita cuprinula maldonaldoi Bechyné, 1953
 Freudeita cupripennis (Lefèvre, 1877)
 Freudeita duplicata (Lefèvre, 1877)
 Freudeita interlata Bechyné & Bechyné, 1961
 Freudeita iracunda Bechyné, 1950
 Freudeita macroscopia Bechyné, 1954
 Freudeita parellina (Erichson, 1847)
 Freudeita peruviana (Bowditch, 1921)
 Freudeita plaumanni Bechyné, 1951
 Freudeita porosa (Jacoby, 1900)
 Freudeita proligens Bechyné, 1951
 Freudeita subopaca Bechyné, 1950
 Freudeita violacea (Lefèvre, 1877)
 Freudeita violacea cyaneoazurea Bechyné, 1951
 Freudeita violacea subnitida Bechyné, 1950
 Freudeita violacea violacea (Lefèvre, 1877)
 Freudeita viridipes (Lefèvre, 1877)
 Freudeita viridipes cyanea (Lefèvre, 1885)
 Freudeita viridipes viridipes (Lefèvre, 1877)

Synonyms:
 Freudeita balyi (Jacoby, 1881): moved back to Colaspis
 Freudeita dentifera Bechyné, 1951: moved to Colaspis
 Freudeita melancholica (Jacoby, 1881): moved back to Colaspis
 Freudeita violacea consentanea (Lefèvre, 1891): synonym of Freudeita violacea (Lefèvre, 1877)

References

Eumolpinae
Chrysomelidae genera
Beetles of South America